Sachindra Prasad Bose (died February 1941) was an Indian independence movement activist and follower of Sir Surendranath Banerjee. He was the son-in-law of the moderate Brahmo leader, Krishna Kumar Mitra. 

On 4 November 1905, when he was a fourth year student of Ripon College, Calcutta, he took initiative to form the Anti-Circular Society in protest against the circular issued by R. W. Carlyle, then Chief Secretary of the Government of Bengal instructing Magistrates and Collectors to take stern measures against students involved in politics. He became its secretary and Krishna Kumar Mitra became its president.

He designed and unfurled the Calcutta Flag on 7 August 1906 in Parsi Bagan Square (Greer Park) in Calcutta, India. In 1908, he was arrested and sent to the Rawalpindi jail. Later, he worked as the editor of a magazine named Vyavsa O Vanijya.

References

External links
The Hindu -Indian Flag

Flag designers
Surendranath College alumni
University of Calcutta alumni
1941 deaths
Year of birth missing